This is a list of the Australia national under-23 soccer team results from 1967 to 1999

1960s

1967

1970s

1974

1980s

1984

1990s

1990

1991

1992

1994

1995

1996

1997

1998

1999

References

External links
 Olyroos (U23) Games

Australia national soccer team